Leptodeuterocopus zonites is a moth of the family Pterophoridae that is known from British Guyana.

Adults are on wing in January and February.

External links

Deuterocopinae
Moths described in 1913